The 2004 Indian general election occurred in Haryana for 10 seats.

List of Elected MPs

References 

Indian general elections in Haryana
2000s in Haryana
Haryana